Pleuroprucha asthenaria, the asthene wave moth, is a moth of the  family Geometridae. It is known from North America (including Florida and Oklahoma), South America and Jamaica.

The larvae feed on various plants, including mangoes, resulting in the premature ripening of the fruit.

References

Cosymbiini